Upanga West is an administrative ward in the Ilala District of the Dar es Salaam Region of Tanzania. According to the 2002 census, the ward has a total population of 9,259.

Amenities and Organisations located in Upanga West

 The Jangwani Girls Secondary School
 The Azania Secondary School
 The Muhimbili University of Health and Allied Sciences
 The Muhimbili National Hospital
 The Muhimbili Orthopaedic Institute
 The Al Muntazir Union Nursery School
 The Tambaza High School
 The International School of Tanganyika: Administration block and Elementary School
 The Al Muntazir Girls’ Primary School
 The Al Muntazir Boys Islamic Seminary
 The Al Muntazir Girls Islamic Seminary
 The Union Sports Club
 The Al Muntazir Toddlers School

References

Ilala District
Wards of Dar es Salaam Region